John Carney Agricultural Complex is a historic farm complex located at Greenville, New Castle County, Delaware.  The complex includes three contributing buildings and four contributing structures. Since 1997, it has been part of Brandywine Creek State Park, although it is not open to the public.

It was added to the National Register of Historic Places in 2009.

References

Farms on the National Register of Historic Places in Delaware
Buildings and structures in New Castle County, Delaware
National Register of Historic Places in New Castle County, Delaware